Harold Allen (born 15 November 1940) is an Australian former cricketer. He played eight first-class matches for Tasmania between 1965 and 1971.

See also
 List of Tasmanian representative cricketers

References

External links
 

1940 births
Living people
Australian cricketers
Tasmania cricketers
Cricketers from Tasmania